The Proud Twins is a Chinese-Hong Kong television series directed by Wong Jing, starring Dicky Cheung, Nicholas Tse, Fan Bingbing, and Yuan Quan. The series is adapted from Gu Long's novel Juedai Shuangjiao. It was first broadcast in 2005 in mainland China.

Cast
 Dicky Cheung as Xiaoyu'er
 Nicholas Tse as Hua Wuque
 Fan Bingbing as Tie Xinlan
 Yuan Quan as Su Ying
 Bo Xue as Murong Xian
 Elvis Tsui as E Tongtian
 Yang Xue as Jiang Yuyan
 Liu Yiwei as Hongye
 Zhang Jizhong as Old Hongye
 Wu Qingzhe as Yan Nantian
 Raymond Wong Ho-yin as Jiang Feng
 Sun Feifei as Hua Yuenu
 Wang Bozhao as Jiang Biehe
 Yumiko Cheng as Jiang Yufeng
 Kong Lin as Yaoyue
 Ni Jingyang as Lianxing
 Li Guohua as Liu Xi
 Zhang Shuangli as Chang Baicao
 Liu Hongmei as Su Rushi
 Wei Hua as Hua Xingnu
 Zhao Xiaorui as Murong Wudi
 Zhu Yan as Murong Shu
 Celest Chong as Princess Taka
 Cheng Sihan as Li Dazui
 Sun Jiaolong as Du Sha
 Sui Yongqing as Tu Jiaojiao
 Bai Yu as Yin Jiuyou
 Haha as Haha'er
 Yang Xiaoyang as Mrs Jiang
 Adam Chen as Murong Zhong
 Xu Min as Murong Zheng
 Li Zhenqi as Tie Ruyun
 Zhang Jianguo as Wushou
 Zhang Guoqing as Wujiao
 Wang Hanwen as Tantian
 Ye Jing as Shuodi
 Zhang Jin as Xiaoxiao
 Sheng Jingyan as Si Qin

Broadcasts

Alternate theme songs
 Libie Jiu (離別酒), the opening theme song of the Taiwanese release, performed by Jang Ho-cheol.
 Mei Name Ai Ta (沒那麼愛他), the ending theme song of the Taiwanese release, performed by Christine Fan.

External links
  The Proud Twins on Sina.com

Chinese wuxia television series
Hong Kong wuxia television series
Works based on Juedai Shuangjiao
2005 Chinese television series debuts
2005 Hong Kong television series debuts
2005 Chinese television series endings
2005 Hong Kong television series endings
Television shows based on works by Gu Long
Television series by Ciwen Media